Peter Otto Chotjewitz (14 June 1934 - 15 December 2010) was a German writer, translator and lawyer.

Biography 

Born in Schöneberg, Berlin to a Jewish family, Chotjewitz made his debut as a writer in the mid-1960s with experimental works, before achieving his breakthrough in the second half of the 1970s with some politically engaged and often controversial novels. He was also very active as a translator of Italian authors, including Leonardo Sciascia, Dario Fo, Giuseppe Fava, Luciano Canfora, and Nanni Balestrini.

Also a lawyer, he served as a defense counsel for terrorist Andreas Baader.

References

External links 
 Peter O. Chotjewitz at Open Library 
 

1934 births
2010 deaths
Writers from Berlin
20th-century German lawyers
German translators